Sandy Brown (July 12, 1926 – March 6, 2005) was an American film and television actor. He was perhaps best known for playing the recurring role of "Logger Pete" on 11 episodes of the American sitcom television series Malcolm in the Middle.

Life and career 
Ward was born in Alamosa, Colorado. He began his career in 1967, first appearing in the crime drama television series Ironside. Later in his career, Ward guest-starred in television programs including JAG, The Six Million Dollar Man, The F.B.I., Hawkins,The Rockford Files, Cagney & Lacey, Hill Street Blues, Trapper John, M.D., St. Elsewhere, Jake and the Fatman, Murder, She Wrote, Simon & Simon, Hart to Hart, The Hardy Boys/Nancy Drew Mysteries, The Fall Guy, Hardcastle and McCormick, The A-Team, The Dukes of Hazzard, Family Ties, The Greatest American Hero and Night Court.

In his film career, Ward co-starred in the 1971 film The Velvet Vampire, where he played Amos. He then played Detective Grunberger in the 1975 film The Hindenburg. Ward appeared in films such as Being There, Cornbread, Earl and Me, Earthquake, Wholly Moses!, Movers & Shakers, Switchback, Executive Action, Terminal Island, The Rose, Lightning Jack, The Onion Field, Delta Force 3: The Killing Game, Under Siege and Airplane II: The Sequel. He played Colonel Maxwell in the 1982 film Some Kind of Hero, with also playing Sistrunk in Police Academy 2: Their First Assignment.

In 1983, Ward played the role of "Sheriff George Bannerman" in the film Cujo, in which he was the local sheriff who arrives at the mechanics house. He is killed by Cujo in the book, in which he later survived from it. Ward co-starred in playing General Hubik in the 1984 film Tank. He played Jeb Ames for five episodes in the soap opera television series Dallas. After that, Ward played the role of "Detective Roy Banks" in The Bold and the Beautiful. He starred in the 1990 film Blue Desert, where he played Walter. Ward also played Quentin in the 2000 film The Perfect Storm. His final credit was from 2003 film Finding Home.

Ward played Hank in the short film Hank & Edgar. He then played the recurring role of "Logger Pete" in the sitcom television series Malcolm in the Middle, with also playing Pop Lazzari in Seinfeld.

Death 
Ward died in March 2005 in Orange County, California, at the age of 78.

Filmography

References

External links 

Rotten Tomatoes profile

1926 births
2005 deaths
People from Alamosa, Colorado
Male actors from Colorado
American male film actors
American male television actors
American male soap opera actors
20th-century American male actors
21st-century American male actors